Phoolan Devi (1963–2001), popularly known as the Bandit Queen, was a Mallah woman who grew up in poverty in a village in the Indian state of Uttar Pradesh. Her family was in a land dispute which caused many problems in her youth and after being repeatedly sexually abused and married off at the age of 11, she joined a dacoit group, later becoming a bandit leader. Her gang robbed higher caste villages and held up trains and vehicles. She became a hero of the lower castes for being a Robin Hood figure who punished her rapists and evaded capture by the authorities for several years. She surrendered in 1983 in a carefully negotiated settlement and served 11 years in Gwalior prison. 

When she was released, she became a politician, standing as a Member of Parliament for the Samajwadi Party in 1996. She lost her seat in 1998 and regained it in 1999. She was the incumbent at the time of her death in 2001. She was assassinated outside her house by Sher Singh Rana, who was eventually convicted for the murder in 2014. Devi's fame grew after the release of the controversial film Bandit Queen in 1994 which told her life story in a way which she did not approve of. She at first blocked the release of the film in India, aided by Arundhati Roy. Her life has inspired several books, including a biography by Mala Sen. Her autobiography was entitled I, Phoolan Devi .

Early life

Devi was born on 10 August 1963 in the village of Gorha Ka Purwa in Jalaun district, Uttar Pradesh, India. The land is filled with gorges and ravines, making it suitable for bandits to roam freely, and is crossed by the Yamuna and Chambal rivers. Her family was poor and from the Mallah fisherman subcaste, which lies towards the bottom of the Hindu caste system in India. Mallahs were a subcaste of Shudra; Devi's family survived by collecting dung cakes to burn as fuel and growing chickpeas, sunflowers and pearl millet.

Her mother was called Moola. She had four sisters and one brother; her father Devidin had one brother, who had a son called Maiyadin. Devi's uncle and his son (her cousin) successfully plotted to steal land from her father, by bribing the village leader to change the land records. They forced Devidin to relinquish the land and Devi's family was compelled to live in a small house on the edge of the village. They continued to harass the family and to steal their crops, aiming to drive them away from the village. At the age of 10, Devi decided to protest against the injustice by going to the disputed land. With her older sister Rukhmini, she sat in a field and ate the chickpeas growing there, saying the crop belonged to her family. Maiyadin ordered her to leave and when she did not, he beat her into unconsciousness; the village leader then decreed that her parents should also be beaten. In 2018, Devi's mother told The Asian Age that she was still fighting to regain the land which Maiyadin had stolen from the family.

Following these events, her parents decided to make an arranged marriage for Devi. She was married to a man called Puttilal, who offered 100 rupees, a cow and a bicycle as a dowry. It was agreed that she would live with him after three years, but less than three months later Puttilal came back and took her away. He was three times her age. She refused his sexual advances and became sick. When her parents came and collected her, they took her to a doctor who gave a diagnosis of measles. For a wife to leave her husband was scandalous; preying on her parents' fears of disgrace, Maiyadin offered to ensure that Puttilal took her back if they signed a paper. The family was illiterate and the parents were warned that the paper also contained a clause giving Maiyadin legal rights to their land, so they refused to sign. Instead, her mother sent Devi to stay with a distant relative in the village of Teoga, where she met her recently married cousin Kailash, who ran errands for bandits (known locally as bahghis or dacoits). They became close and had an affair, which resulted in Devi being ordered by his wife to return to her own village.

Back in Gorha Ka Purwa, the second son of the village leader became infatuated with Devi and when she did not return his affections, he attacked her. Again, Devi needed to leave the village and Maiyadin pressured the family to ask Puttilal to take her back, so Devi returned to her husband; in the meantime he had taken another wife who enjoyed mistreating her. After several years, Puttilal abandoned her beside the river and she again returned to the parental home. In January 1979, Maiyadin destroyed the family's crops and began to chop down a neem tree on their land. When Devi threw stones at him and wounded his face, she was arrested by the local police and detained for one month. She later told The Atlantic that she was arrested because Maiyadin accused her of robbing him. Her biographer Mala Sen asked if she had been raped at the station and Devi replied "They had plenty of fun at my expense and beat the hell out of me too". Sen notes that it is common for victims of sexual assault to avoid or repress talking about what happened to them. Sen also observes that from the mid-1970s onwards, Indian feminist groups were recording many instances of women being attacked and murdered by men.

Bandit Queen

For reasons that Devi has explained in multiple ways, a gang of bandits led by Babu Gujjar came to seize her from her family's home. Devi hid from the bandits until they threatened her brother, whereupon she revealed herself and was taken away into the ravines. Gujjar took her as his property and raped her every night. His second in command was Vikram Mallah, who became fond of Devi. When the opportunity presented itself, Vikram killed Gujjar and became leader of the gang. 

Vikram trained Devi to use a rifle. Over the next year, the gang robbed trains and vehicles, and looted higher caste villages, sometimes using stolen police uniforms as a disguise. They lived in the ravines, constantly moving between places such as Devariya, Kanpur and Orai. Vikram and Devi fell in love and became a couple. The gang returned to punish Puttilal and Devi beat him up. She became wildly popular with the poor, who called her Dasyu Sundari (Beautiful Bandit) and was celebrated by most of the Indian mainstream media as a Robin Hood figure, who robbed the rich to give to the poor. She was seen as an incarnation of the Hindu goddess Durga and a doll was produced of her in police uniform wearing a bandoleer.

The crime spree was interrupted when a former gang leader, Shri Ram Singh, was released from prison together with his brother Lalla Ram Singh. They were from a higher caste than the rest of the gang, so when they rejoined it a power struggle began, which ended when Shri Ram murdered Vikram. Without Vikram's protection, Devi could not escape from Shri Ram, who took her to the remote village of Behmai where she was repeatedly raped by Thakur men (Thakurs being a subcaste of the higher Kshatriya caste); in a final indignity, she was forced to collect water for him from the well whilst naked, in front of the villagers.  The rapists included Chheda Singh.

Devi managed to escape and formed another gang with Man Singh. They lived on wild berries and produce stolen from cultivated fields. The following year, she returned to Behmai with her gang on 14 February 1981. Speaking through a loudhailer, she demanded that the villagers hand over Shri Ram and Lalla Ram, then her gang went from house to house looting valuables. When the two men could not be found, 22 Thakur men were lined up at the Yamuna river and shot from behind. Two survived and twenty died. The Behmai massacre led Thakur farmers to pressure Prime Minister Indira Gandhi to impose the rule of law. When she was later arrested in 1983, Devi claimed that she had not been present at the time of the shooting. This was confirmed by the evidence of the two men who survived, who stated that they had not seen Devi and that a man called Ram Avtar was giving orders. By other accounts, such as that of journalist Khushwant Singh, it was Devi who put the men to death. For Dalits, people of the lowest subcastes, Devi was to be celebrated for fighting back against her abuse by men of a higher caste and when she eluded capture by the authorities her fame grew. The killings prompted the resignation of V. P. Singh, the Chief Minister of Uttar Pradesh. It was later clarified that the dead men were composed of seventeen Thakurs, one Muslim, one Dalit and one Other Backward Class; Devi was charged in absentia with 48 crimes, which included 22 murders, kidnapping and looting.

Whilst Devi was on the run, her mother was held for five months in Kalpi prison. Devi herself was nearly caught by the police on 31 March 1981 and had to shoot her way out. In 1983, Devi surrendered to the authorities after long negotiations led by Rajendra Chaturvedi, a police officer from Bhind. Dressed in a police uniform and still armed with a Mauser rifle, she bowed before representations of Durga and Gandhi, then prostrated herself in front of Arjun Singh, chief minister of Madhya Pradesh with 8,000 people watching. Devi had set conditions regarding her surrender, which included: no death penalty for anyone from her gang; a maximum custodial sentence of eight years; no use of handcuffs; being imprisoned as a group; being imprisoned in Madhya Pradesh and not Uttar Pradesh; her family being given land with their goat and cow; her brother getting a government job. She and seven men, including Man Singh, surrendered. Mala Sen records that the male journalists gathered in Bhind to watch her surrender were unimpressed with her plain appearance. 

The gang was incarcerated at Gwalior. Despite the promise she would not spend more than eight years in prison, Devi spent over ten years on remand. During this time, she had tuberculosis and she was diagnosed with two stomach tumours. Whilst receiving hospital treatment, she received a hysterectomy without her consent. The others, including Man Singh, agreed to trials in Uttar Pradesh and were all acquitted, but Devi refused to make a deal and remained convinced she would be murdered if she went there.

Political career
Charges against Devi were dropped in 1994 by order of the central government of Mulayam Singh Yadav, from the Samajwadi Party. After her release from prison, she joined the Samajwadi Party. In 1996, she was elected to the Lok Sabha as a Member of Parliament (MP) for Mirzapur in Uttar Pradesh. She won with a majority of 37,000 and had over 300,000 votes in total. She was not the only illiterate MP, joining others such as Bhagwati Devi and Shobhawati Devi. Devi campaigned with limited success for the rights of women and to provide better amenities for the poor. She told Roy Moxham "I want to bring hospitals, schools, electricity and clean water to the poor in the villages. To stop child marriage and to improve life for women."

There were still charges against Devi in Uttar Pradesh and in 1996, she lost her Supreme Court appeal to have them dropped. The following year, the court approved a request from Uttar Pradesh to arraign Devi on charges related to the Behmai massacre. She did not attend the court date in Kanpur, to the outrage of the widows of Behmai. After several months of legal machinations, the Supreme Court ruled that Devi did not need to be jailed before trial. She lost her seat to the Bharatiya Janata Party candidate in the 1998 elections, then regained it the following year. She was holding the position at the time of her death, at the age of 37.

Popular culture 

Devi's autobiography I, Phoolan Devi was dictated by her onto tape and then edited into a book which was published first in French and then other European languages and also Japanese and Malay. The income from book sales supported Devi and enabled her to pay her legal fees. She married again to Umed Singh and appeared in a film with him called Sholay Aur Chingari (Blazing Fires and Sparks). Together with her new husband, she became a Buddhist, aiming to evade the Hindu caste system. They attended a ceremony at Deekshabhoomi in 1995. Moxham reported that she then renounced Buddhism.

The 1994 film Bandit Queen was loosely based on Mala Sen's biography; it was directed by Shekhar Kapur and starred Seema Biswas as Devi. After it received acclaim at Cannes Film Festival, Kapur asked for permission from the Central Board of Film Certification to screen the film at cinemas in India. Devi attempted to block the release, commenting "It's simply not the story of my life". She was supported by the feminist and novelist Arundhati Roy, who wrote a critique of the film entitled The Great Indian Rape Trick. In his autobiography (published in 2021), Farrukh Dhondy, the commissioning editor at Channel 4, described how he rushed to Delhi to sign a cheque to get Umed Singh to persuade Devi to drop her complaint. Moxham writes that when Devi discovered Singh had taken this payment, they became estranged, before later reconciling again. A court case was made against the film at the Delhi High Court by lawyer Indira Singh and Arundhati Roy. Ultimately, Devi received £40,000 from Channel 4 and dropped the complaint.

Assassination

At 13:30 on 25 July 2001, Devi was shot dead by three unknown assailants outside her house at 44 Ashoka Road in New Delhi. She was shot nine times and her bodyguard was hit twice; he returned fire as the attackers escaped by car. She was rushed to Lohia Hospital and was pronounced dead on arrival. All business of both houses of Parliament was adjourned for two days and the funeral took place in Mirzapur.

Days after the murder, Sher Singh Rana was arrested and claimed he had shot at Devi, saying the assassination was revenge for the Behmai massacre. Rana was an Uttaranchal political activist who at first struggled to convince police that he was present at the murder. He escaped from Tihar Jail in 2004 and was recaptured two years later. In August 2014, Rana received a life sentence for murder, with ten other co-defendants being acquitted. He was subsequently granted bail in October 2016. In 2018, Devi's sister Munni claimed that Rana had been framed by a government conspiracy and that Devi had been murdered on the order of Umed Singh.

Legacy

Devi's fame throughout India continued to grow after her death and the controversy surrounding the Bandit Queen film had already ensured that she was globally famous; she has become legendary, alongside other outlaw figures like Ned Kelly, Sándor Rózsa and Pancho Villa. Her life has inspired biographies by Roy Moxham, Mala Sen, and Richard Shears and Isobelle Gidley, and novels by Irène Frain and Dimitri Friedman. A graphic novel entitled Phoolan Devi, Rebel Queen was published in 2020.

Scholar Tatiana Szurlej notes that the facts presented in these biographies often contradict each other, despite coming from interviews with Devi herself. In 1994, Arundhati Roy commented "she is suffering from a case of Legenditis. She's only a version of herself. There are other versions of her that are jostling for attention." Media theorist Sandra Ponzanesi sees Devi's life as an exemplary case of a postcolonial subject attempting to preserve their agency in the face of an Orientalist gaze.

Several films have been made about her life. Ashok Roy made the 1984 film Pholaan Devi in Bengali language and followed it the next year with a Hindi version entitled Kahani Phoolvati Ki. Bandit Queen came out in 1994 and, Hossein Martin Fazeli was making a documentary about her. In 2022, Farrukh Dhondy announced that he was making a web series about her life told from the perspective of Rajendra Chaturvedi, the person who arranged her surrender.

Devi has been represented in fine art by painters such as Rekha Rodwittiya. Her life has also been commemorated by folk singers, making her into a mythical outlaw figure. Shirish Korde wrote an opera called Phoolan Devi: The Bandit Queen which premiered in 2010 at the Tsai Music Centre at the University of Boston. In 2018, the NISHAD Party laid claim to Devi's political legacy, saying that it would build a statue to Devi in Gorakhpur since the mallah subcaste forms part of the Nishad caste. Three years later, in 2021, in order to mark twenty years since the assassination, the Vikassheel Insaan Party proposed to place statues of her in 18 districts of Uttar Pradesh. In Unnao and Varanasi, the local authorities blocked the installation of the statues.

Selected works

See also
 Jagga Jatt
 Paan Singh Tomar
 Seema Parihar
 Ashok Mahto gang
 List of assassinated Indian politicians

Notes

References

Further reading

Indian female criminals
1963 births
2001 deaths
People from Jalaun district
20th-century Indian politicians
1979 crimes
Assassinated activists
2001 murders in India
Converts to Buddhism from Hinduism
Female organized crime figures
Indian Buddhists
Indian politicians convicted of crimes
Indian prisoners and detainees
Indian robbers
Women in Uttar Pradesh politics
Outlaws
People from Mirzapur district
People murdered in India
India MPs 1996–1997
India MPs 1999–2004
Deaths by firearm in India
Murdered criminals
Assassinated Indian politicians
21st-century Indian women politicians
21st-century Indian politicians
Women members of the Lok Sabha
20th-century Indian women politicians